Glăvile is a commune in Vâlcea County, Oltenia, Romania. It is composed of five villages: Aninoasa, Glăvile, Jaroștea, Olteanca, and Voiculeasa.

Natives
 Bartolomeu Anania

References

Communes in Vâlcea County
Localities in Oltenia